San Miguel Airport  is an airport serving San Miguel, a town in the Pearl Islands of Panama. It is just east of the town, on the northern side of Isla del Rey, the largest of the islands.

Northeast approach and departure are over the water. There is rising terrain south of the airport.

Airlines and destinations

See also

Transport in Panama
List of airports in Panama

References

External links
 OurAirports - San Miguel Airport
 FallingRain - San Miguel
 Panoramio - San Miguel Airport
 Panoramio - San Miguel Airport

Airports in Panama